"All True Man" is a song written by Jimmy Jam and Terry Lewis and recorded by American recording artist Alexander O'Neal. It is the first single from the singer's fourth solo studio album, All True Man (1991). It is one of the artist's most recognizable signature songs, and a favourite of many O'Neal fans worldwide.

Release
Alexander O'Neal's 18th hit single, it reached #18 in the UK Singles Chart, his sixth and most recent single to reach the top 20 there. In the United States, the single reached #5 on Billboard's Hot R&B/Hip-Hop Singles & Tracks, narrowly missing the top 40 on the Billboard Hot 100.

Track listing
 12" Maxi (45 73626) 
"All True Man (Classic Club Mix)" – 7:10
"All True Man (Radio Mix)" – 4:03
"All True Man (Big House Mix)" – 8:00
"All True Man (Big House Instrumental)" – 5:17

 7" Single (656571 7)
"All True Man" – 4:04 #
"Hang On" – 6:20

 CD Single (656571 2) 
"All True Man" – 4:04
"Hang On" – 6:20
"The Official Bootleg Mega-Mix (12'' Version)" – 9:34

 Cassette Single (35T73627)
"All True Man (Radio Edit)" – 4:04
"All True Man (Instrumental)" – 4:04

Personnel
Credits are adapted from the album's liner notes.

 Alexander O'Neal – lead vocals 
 Jimmy Jam – keyboards, synthesizer, drum programming, rhythm & vocal arrangements
 Terry Lewis – percussion, rhythm & vocal arrangements, backing vocals
 Karyn White – backing vocals

Charts

Weekly charts

Year-end charts

References

External links
 

1991 singles
Alexander O'Neal songs
Songs written by Jimmy Jam and Terry Lewis
1991 songs
Song recordings produced by Jimmy Jam and Terry Lewis
Tabu Records singles